1602 Indiana, provisional designation , is a stony Florian asteroid from the inner regions of the asteroid belt, approximately 8 kilometers in diameter.

It was discovered on 14 March 1950, by IU's Indiana Asteroid Program at Goethe Link Observatory near Brooklyn, Indiana, in the United States. It was later named after the U.S. state of Indiana and for Indiana University.

Classification and orbit 

Indiana is a member of the Flora family, a large collisional group of stony S-type asteroids in the inner main-belt. It orbits the Sun at a distance of 2.0–2.5 AU once every 3 years and 4 months (1,229 days). Its orbit has an eccentricity of 0.10 and an inclination of 4° with respect to the ecliptic.

Physical characteristics

Rotation period 

Three rotational lightcurves of Indiana were obtained from photometric observations taken by astronomer Michael Pietschnig, Gary Vander Haagen and Michael Fleenor in Spring 2007. The lightcurve analysis gave a rotation period between 2.57 and 2.61 hours with a change in brightness of 0.12 to 0.19 magnitude, respectively.

Diameter and albedo 

According to the surveys carried out by the Japanese Akari satellite and NASA's Wide-field Infrared Survey Explorer with its subsequent NEOWISE mission, Indiana measures between 7.97 and 8.52 kilometers in diameter, and its surface has an albedo between 0.250 and 0.297. The Collaborative Asteroid Lightcurve Link assumes an albedo of 0.24 – derived from 8 Flora, the largest member and namesake of this family – and calculates a diameter of 8.62 kilometers with an absolute magnitude of 12.49.

Naming 

This minor planet was named for the U.S. state of Indiana and for Indiana University with its astronomy department, which is the parent institution of the discovering Goethe Link Observatory.

Originally the discovery was credited to Beryl H. Potter (1900–1985), after whom the asteroid 1729 Beryl is named. She was research assistant at the Indiana University, who participated in the program of minor planet observations from 1949 to 1966. During this period, she analysed nearly 6,300 photographic plates, measuring the positions of minor planets and reporting lost asteroids to IAU's Minor Planet Circulars (MPCs) for publication. However, according to Frank K. Edmondson (1912–2008), chairman of the Astronomy Department of Indiana University (also see 1761 Edmondson), there were several assistants involved in blinking the photographic plates during the first years of the program. The discovery was therefore credited to Indiana University, instead. The official  was published by the Minor Planet Center in January 1955.

Notes

References

External links 
 Asteroid Lightcurve Database (LCDB), query form (info )
 Dictionary of Minor Planet Names, Google books
 Asteroids and comets rotation curves, CdR – Observatoire de Genève, Raoul Behrend
 Discovery Circumstances: Numbered Minor Planets (1)-(5000) – Minor Planet Center
 
 

001602
001602
Named minor planets
001602
19500314